Idols East Africa was a singing competition, serving as the second season of the pan-African franchise of the Idol series after Idols West Africa.  It  premiered on April 6, 2008, and ended on July 27, 2008.

Participating countries are located on the eastern and southern parts of Africa such as Botswana, Kenya, Malawi, Tanzania, Uganda, Zambia, and Zimbabwe.  Audition venues will be held in each of these countries.  The competition is also open to citizens of Burundi, Comoros, Djibouti, Ethiopia, Eritrea, Lesotho, Madagascar, Mauritius, Mozambique, Namibia, Réunion, Rwanda, Seychelles, Somalia, and Swaziland, but would have to  meet the requirements before auditioning in one of the seven audition venues.

Themes

June 2: African Americans
June 9: 50s, 60s and 70s
June 16: New Millennium
June 23: Birth Decade
June 30: African Home Grown
July 7: My Idols
July 14: Producer's Choice
July 21: Ultimate Wishlist
July 27: Grand Finale

Finals Elimination Chart

No real bottom three were announced on June 23. Mkhululi and Nicolette were just randomly placed alongside Cynthia in the "unsafe" group.
No real bottom three were announced on July 24. Trinah and Eric were just randomly placed alongside in the "unsafe" candidates group.

Voting

Voting is done by ranking the contestants per country and finding the average rank. This is to prevent countries with larger voting power from giving the contestants from their country an unfair advantage.

References

External links
Official Website

Idols (franchise)
Television series by Fremantle (company)
2008 television series debuts
2008 television series endings
Non-British television series based on British television series